Göran Harry Svensson (11 June 1945 —) is a former Swedish footballer (midfielder).

Harry Svensson debuted for IFK Göteborg in 1965. In 1971, Svensson joined Djurgårdens IF. He made 124 Allsvenskan appearances for Djurgårdens IF and scored 44 goals. Later, Svensson joined Västerås SK.

References

Swedish footballers
Sweden international footballers
Allsvenskan players
IFK Göteborg players
Djurgårdens IF Fotboll players
1945 births
Living people
Association football midfielders